Garjee railway station  is a railway station in Gomati district, Tripura. Its code is JRJE. It serves Garjee village. The station lies on the Agartala–Sabroom rail section, which comes under the Lumding railway division of the Northeast Frontier Railway. The segment from Garjee to Sabroom became operational on  3 October 2019.

Station layout

Major trains

07682/07684/07690 Agartala-Garjee-Sabroom
07689/07683/07681 Sabroom-Garjee-Agartala

See also

References

External links

 Indian Railways site
 Indian railway fan club

Railway stations in South Tripura district
Lumding railway division
Proposed railway stations in India